The Consultative Committee for Space Data Systems (CCSDS) was founded in 1982 for governmental and quasi-governmental space agencies to discuss and develop standards for space data and information systems. Currently composed of "eleven member agencies, twenty-eight observer agencies, and over 140 industrial associates," the CCSDS works to support collaboration and interoperability between member agencies through the establishment of data and system standards. According to the organisation's website, more than 1000 space missions have utilized data and systems standards created by CCSDS. The activities of the CCSDS are organized around six topic areas and composed of many working groups within the overall Collaborative Working Group Environment (CWE).

Publications and standards
The CCSDS is divided into 6 Technical areas: 
 Space Internetworking Services
 Mission Operations And Information Management Services
 Spacecraft Onboard Interface Services
 System Engineering
 Cross Support Services
 Space Link Services

The CCSDS has developed data standards and information system frameworks covering a variety of areas including data creation, transmission, management, and preservation as well as the systems supporting that data. These include protocols and network notes for communication in space including contributions to Interplanetary Internet and Space Communications Protocol Specifications. Other standards include XML Telemetric and Command Exchange and frameworks such as the Mission Operations Services Concept and the Open Archival Information System, the latter a model also adopted by the broader Digital preservation and Data curation community.

Some of the Standards developed by the CCSDS are:
 CCSDS Mission Operations services
 CCSDS File Delivery Protocol (CFDP)
 Electronic Data Sheets (EDS)
 Space Link Extension (SLE)
 XML Telemetric and Command Exchange (XTCE)

Membership
Each nation participating in the CCSDS can have one organization serve as a member agency. The current 11 member agencies in the CCSDS are:
Agenzia Spaziale Italiana (ASI) or, Italian Space Agency, Italy
Canadian Space Agency (CSA), Canada
Centre National d'Etudes Spatiales (CNES) or, National Centre for Space Studies, France
China National Space Administration (CNSA), China
Deutsches Zentrum für Luft- und Raumfahrt (DLR), Germany
European Space Agency (ESA)
National Institute for Space Research (INPE), Brazil
Japan Aerospace Exploration Agency (JAXA), Japan
National Aeronautics and Space Administration (NASA), United States
ROSCOSMOS, Russia
UK Space Agency, United Kingdom

See also
 List of government space agencies

References

External links
 CCSDS Official Website

Deep Space Network
Standards organizations
Space standards
Consultative Committee for Space Data Systems
Organizations established in 1982